Synaptotagmin-11 is a protein that in humans is encoded by the SYT11 gene.

Interactions 

SYT11 has been shown to interact with Parkin (ligase).

References

Further reading